Inwałd  is a village in the administrative district of Gmina Andrychów, within Wadowice County, Lesser Poland Voivodeship, in southern Poland.

The village has a population of 3,202.

The village was first mentioned in 1317 as Hoyenewaldt and later as Helwand (1326), Henwald (1346), Hynwald (1430), Huwalth (1529), Inwald (1581).

References

Villages in Wadowice County